Wesley Natã Wachholz (born 18 April 1995), known as Wesley Natã or simply Wesley, is a Brazilian professional footballer who plays as a winger for Russian First League club Rodina Moscow.

Club career
Born in Porto Alegre, Rio Grande do Sul, Wesley was a Chapecoense youth graduate. He made his senior debut on 24 April 2016, coming on as a late substitute for fellow youth graduate Hyoran in a 2–3 Campeonato Catarinense away loss against Criciúma.

In July 2016, Wesley was loaned to Concórdia. On 13 September, he moved to Série B side Bahia, also in a temporary deal. He made his professional debut on 9 October, starting and scoring the second in a 4–0 home routing of Tupi. In the summer of 2019 he signed with Bulgarian club Tsarsko Selo Sofia.

Honours
Riga 
Latvian Higher League:2020

Chapecoense
Campeonato Catarinense: 2016, 2017

References

External links

1995 births
Footballers from Porto Alegre
Living people
Brazilian footballers
Association football forwards
Associação Chapecoense de Futebol players
Concórdia Atlético Clube players
Esporte Clube Bahia players
Esporte Clube Juventude players
Atlético Clube Goianiense players
Clube Atlético Votuporanguense players
FC Tsarsko Selo Sofia players
Riga FC players
Campeonato Brasileiro Série A players
Campeonato Brasileiro Série B players
First Professional Football League (Bulgaria) players
Latvian Higher League players
Russian First League players
Brazilian expatriate footballers
Expatriate footballers in Bulgaria
Brazilian expatriate sportspeople in Bulgaria
Expatriate footballers in Latvia
Brazilian expatriate sportspeople in Latvia
Expatriate footballers in Russia
Brazilian expatriate sportspeople in Russia